The 1962 NC State Wolfpack football team represented North Carolina State University during the 1962 NCAA University Division football season. The Wolfpack were led by ninth-year head coach Earle Edwards and played their home games at Riddick Stadium in Raleigh, North Carolina. They competed as members of the Atlantic Coast Conference, finishing tied for fourth.

Schedule

References

NC State
NC State Wolfpack football seasons
NC State Wolfpack football